Gustavo Arribas was the Director-General of the Federal Intelligence Agency of Argentina. He was appointed to the position in December 2015.

Career
Prior to heading the Federal Intelligence Agency, Arribas was an agent and broker for professional soccer players.

Corruption allegations
Arribas was accused by Brazilian police of receiving $850,000 through a money-laundering scheme.

Arribas was also investigated for possibly accepting a bribe of $600,000 from Odebrecht in 2013.

References

Living people
Year of birth missing (living people)
Directors of intelligence agencies
People of Argentine intelligence agencies
People named in the Panama Papers
Argentine sports agents
Association football agents